David Fitzgerald may refer to:

David FitzGerald (died 1176), medieval bishop of St David's in Wales
David Scott FitzGerald, sociologist
David Fitzgerald (cricketer) (born 1972), Australian first-class cricketer
David Fitzgerald (field hockey)
David Fitzgerald (Inagh-Kilnamona hurler) (born 1996), Irish hurler
David Fitzgerald (born 1951), British woodwind player and founding member of the band, Iona
Dave Fitzgerald (presenter)

See also
Dai Fitzgerald (1872–1951), Welsh rugby player
Davy Fitzgerald (born 1971), Irish hurler